David Nathan Weil (born 1961) is the James and Merryl Tisch Professor of Economics at Brown University. Weil's scholarship has focused on economic growth and demographic economics. Between 2015 and 2018, Weil chaired Brown's Department of Economics.

Education and Research 
Weil received a Bachelor of Arts in history from Brown University in 1982. He completed his doctorate in economics at Harvard University in 1990.

Weil's most widely cited paper is "A Contribution to the Empirics of Economic Growth," coauthored with Gregory Mankiw and David Romer and published in the Quarterly Journal of Economics in 1992. The paper argues that the Solow growth model, once augmented to include a role for human capital, does a reasonably good job of explaining international differences in standards of living. According to Google Scholar, it has been cited more than 20,000 times, making it one of the most cited articles in the field of economics.

References

External links 

 

1961 births
Living people
Brown University alumni
Harvard University alumni
Brown University faculty

21st-century American economists